Rugby union in Wales is governed by the Welsh Rugby Union. The top level of Welsh rugby is represented by the regional sides, formed in 2003, who play in the United Rugby Championship (formerly the Celtic League, Pro12 or Pro14). Originally consisting of five teams, there are currently four regional sides in the United Rugby Championship, after the Celtic Warriors were wound up in 2004.

Below this is the Welsh Premier Division, Welsh Championship, then Division 1, Division 2, Division 3, Division 4, Division 5 and Division 6 are split geographically into East, East Central, North, West and West Central. Division Three North and Division 3 West are both split geographically into two leagues.

United Rugby Championship

 Cardiff Rugby
 Dragons RFC
 Ospreys
 Scarlets

Welsh Premier Division

 Aberavon RFC
 Bridgend Ravens
 Cardiff RFC
 Carmarthen Quins
 Ebbw Vale RFC
 Llandovery RFC
 Llanelli RFC
 Merthyr RFC
 Newport RFC
 Pontypridd RFC
 RGC 1404
 Swansea RFC

Welsh Championship

 Beddau RFC
 Bargoed RFC
 Bedwas RFC
 Cardiff Metropolitan University RFC
 Cross Keys RFC
 Glamorgan Wanderers RFC
 Maesteg Harlequins RFC
 Narberth RFC
 Neath RFC
 Pontypool RFC
 Tata Steel RFC
 Trebanos RFC
 Ystalyfera RFC
 Ystrad Rhondda RFC

WRU Division 1

WRU Division 1 East
 Blaenavon RFC
 Brecon RFC
 Brynmawr RFC
 Dowlais RFC
 Monmouth RFC
 Nelson RFC
 Penallta RFC
 Pontypool United RFC
 Risca RFC
 Senghenydd RFC
 Ynysybwl RFC

WRU Division 1 East Central
 Barry RFC
 Cambrian Welfare RFC
 Dowlais RFC
 Llantrisant RFC
 Mountain Ash RFC
 Rhiwbina RFC
 Rhydyfelin RFC
 Rumney RFC
 St. Joseph's RFC
 St. Peters RFC
 Treorchy RFC
 Ynysybwl RFC

WRU Division 1 North
 Bala RFC
 Bethesda RFC
 Caernarfon RFC
 COBRA
 Dinbych RFC
 Dolgellau RFC
 Llandudno RFC
 Llangefni RFC
 Nant Conwy RFC
 Pwllheli RFC
 Ruthin RFC

WRU Division 1 West Central
 Ammanford RFC
 Birchgrove RFC
 Bonymaen RFC
 Bridgend Athletic RFC
 Brynamman RFC
 Dunvant RFC
 Glynneath RFC
 Kenfig Hill RFC
 Nantyffyllon RFC
 Skewen RFC
 Tondu RFC
 Waunarlwydd RFC

WRU Division 1 West
 Aberystwyth RFC
 Crymych RFC
 Felinfoel RFC
 Gorseinon RFC
 Gowerton RFC
 Hendy RFC
 Llanelli Wanderers RFC
 Llangennech RFC
 Newcastle Emlyn RFC
 Pembroke RFC
 Penclawdd RFC
 Whitland RFC

WRU Division 2

WRU Division 2 East
 Abergavenny RFC
 Blackwood RFC
 Caerleon RFC
 Caldicot RFC
 Croesyceiliog RFC
 Cwmbran RFC
 Newport HSOB RFC
 Oakdale RFC
 Pill Harriers RFC
 Talywain RFC
 Ynysddu RFC

WRU Division 2 East Central
 Abercwmboi RFC
 Abercynon RFC
 Aberdare RFC
 Caerphilly RFC
 Cilfynydd RFC
 Cowbridge RFC
 Gilfach Goch RFC
 Llanishen RFC
 Llantrisant RFC
 Llantwit Fardre RFC
 Taffs Well RFC
 Treharris RFC

WRU Division 2 North
 Abergele RFC
 Bangor RFC
 Colwyn Bay RFC
 Mold RFC
 Nant Conwy RFC II
 Newtown RFC
 Rhyl and District RFC
 Shotton Steel RFC
 Welshpool RFC
 Wrexham RFC

WRU Division 2 West Central
 Aberavon Quins RFC
 Bridgend Sports RFC
 Builth Wells RFC
 Heol y Cyw RFC
 Maesteg Celtic RFC
 Morriston RFC
 Pencoed RFC
 Porthcawl RFC
 Pyle RFC
 Resolven RFC
 Ystradgynlais RFC

WRU Division 2 West
 Burry Port RFC
 Carmarthen Athletic RFC
 Fishguard and Goodwick RFC
 Kidwelly RFC
 Loughor RFC
 Milford Haven RFC
 Mumbles RFC
 Nantgaredig RFC
 Pontarddulais RFC
 Pontyberem RFC
 Tenby United RFC
 Tycroes RFC

WRU Division 3

WRU Division 3 North East
 Bala RFC II
 Bro Gwernant RFC
 COBRA RFC II
 Dinbych RFC II
 Flint RFC
 Llanidloes RFC
 Machynlleth RFC
 Mold RFC II
 Rhosllanerchrugog RFC
 Ruthin RFC II
 Wrexham RFC II

WRU Division 3 North West
 Bethesda RFC II
 Bro Ffestiniog RFC
 Caernarfon RFC II
 Holyhead RFC
 Llandudno RFC II
 Llangefni RFC II
 Menai Bridge RFC
 Porthmadog RFC
 Pwllheli RFC II
 Rhyl & District RFC II

WRU Division 3 East
 Abercarn RFC
 Abertillery RFC
 Abertysswg RFC
 Blaina RFC
 Garndiffaith
 Llanhilleth RFC
 Machen RFC
 Rhymney RFC
 RTB Ebbw Vale RFC
 Tredegar Ironsides RFC
 Usk RFC

WRU Division 3 East Central
 Canton RFC
 Cardiff Quins RFC
 CR Cymry Caerdydd
 Fairwater RFC
 Llanharan RFC
 Old Illtydians RFC
 Penarth RFC
 Pentyrch RFC
 Penygraig RFC
 Pontyclun RFC
 St Albans RFC
 Tylorstown RFC

WRU Division 3 West Central
 Abercrave RFC
 Aberavon Green Stars RFC
 Baglan RFC
 Bryncoch RFC
 Cwmafan RFC
 Cwmgors RFC
 Cwmllynfell RFC
 Nantymoel RFC
 Swansea Uplands RFC
 Taibach RFC
 Tonmawr RFC
 Vardre RFC

WRU Division 3 West A
 Aberaeron RFC
 Cardigan RFC
 Haverfordwest RFC
 Lampeter Town RFC
 Laugharne RFC
 Llangwm RFC
 Llanybydder RFC
 Neyland RFC
 Pembroke Dock Harlequins RFC
 St Clears RFC
 St. Davids RFC
 Tregaron RFC

WRU Division 3 West B
 Amman United RFC
 Betws RFC
 Bynea RFC
 Cefneithin RFC
 Furnace United RFC
 Llandeilo RFC
 Llandybie RFC
 Llangadog RFC
 New Dock Stars RFC
 Penygroes RFC
 Trimsaran RFC
 Tumble RFC

WRU Division 4

WRU Division 4 East
 Bedwellty RFC
 Blackwood Stars RFC
 Chepstow RFC
 Fleur De Lys RFC
 Hafodyrynys RFC
 Nantyglo RFC
 New Panteg RFC
 New Tredegar RFC
 Newport Saracens RFC
 St Julians HSOB RFC
 Trinant RFC
 Whitehead RFC

WRU Division 4 East Central
 Caerau Ely RFC
 Cefn Coed RFC
 Gwernyfed RFC
 Llandaff RFC
 Llandaff North RFC
 Llantwit Major RFC
 Old Penarthians RFC
 Tonyrefail RFC
 Treherbert RFC
 Wattstown RFC
 Ynysowen RFC

WRU Division 4 West Central
 Altwen RFC
 Briton Ferry RFC
 Bryncethin RFC
 Cefn Cribwr RFC
 Crynant RFC
 Glais RFC
 Glyncorrwg RFC
 Maesteg RFC
 Neath Athletic RFC
 Penlan RFC
 Pontrhydyfen RFC

WRU Division 5

WRU Division 5 East
 Beaufort RFC
 Bettws RFC
 Brynithel RFC
 Crickhowell RFC
 Crumlin RFC
 Hollybush RFC
 Pontllanfraith RFC

WRU Division 5 East Central
 Brackla RFC
 Cardiff Internationals RFC
 Cardiff Saracens RFC
 Ferndale RFC
 Hirwaun RFC
 Llandrindod Wells RFC
 Ogmore Vale RFC
 Pontycymmer RFC
 Sully Sports RFC
 Tref y Clawdd RFC
 Whitchurch RFC

WRU Division 5 West Central
 Banwen RFC
 Cwmgwrach RFC
 Cwmtwrch RFC
 Fall Bay RFC
 Pantyffynon RFC
 Penybanc RFC
 Pontardawe RFC
 Pontyates RFC
 Rhigos RFC
 Seven Sisters RFC
 South Gower RFC
 Tonna RFC

WRU Division 6

WRU Division 6 East
 Abersychan RFC
 Cwmcarn United RFC
 Forgeside RFC
 Girling RFC
 Hartridge RFC
 Magor RFC
 Old Tyleryan RFC
 Trefil RFC
 West Mon RFC

See also

 United Rugby Championship
 Principality Premiership

References

Wales
 
Rugby union clubs
Rugby